

Auditions

Pre-Auditions

Theatre Auditions 
Acts who were accepted in the pre-auditions, make it through to the theatre audition, where it is televised with a live audience.
For the theatre auditions, there are 6 episodes where hundreds of acts are put through to have a chance to get to the next round - the semi finals, although only 21 acts will get through.

Top 21 Acts
After the theatre auditions, the judges decide which 21 acts will go through to the live shows. There are 3 semi-finals and 1 final each with its own results show. Only 2 acts from each semi-final will advance to the final.

Top 21 List Summary

Semi-finals

Semi Final 1 (22 October) 

Results Show 1 Guest: Bhizer&Busiswa

Semi Final 2 (29 October) 

Results Show 2 Guest: Amanda Black

Semi Final 3 (5 November) 

Results Show 3 Guest: Just Robyn

Finals

Finale (12 November) 

Final Results Show Guest: Sketchy Bongo 
 

Got Talent
2017 South African television seasons